David Emilio Mainz Navarro (born 21 June 1985) is a Spanish footballer who plays for Borja as a forward.

Club career
Born in Sádaba, Province of Zaragoza, Mainz made his senior debuts with SD Ejea in the 2004–05 season, in Tercera División. He first arrived in Segunda División B in 2010, signing with CD La Muela also in his native Aragon.

On 9 July 2011, Mainz joined fellow league team SD Eibar. In his second year he scored 11 goals in the regular season (plus two in the play-offs), helping the Basque side to return to Segunda División after a four-year absence.

On 29 May 2013, Mainz announced he was moving to Club Jorge Wilstermann from Bolivia, being presented on 9 July. On 23 January of the following year, however, he returned to both his country and Eibar.

Mainz appeared in his first game as a professional on 1 February 2014, starting in a 1–0 home win against UD Las Palmas. He appeared in 13 matches during the campaign, as the Armeros were promoted to La Liga for the first time ever.

On 11 July 2014, Mainz terminated his contract with Eibar and moved to Greek Football League side Athlitiki Enosi Larissa F.C. six days later. On 14 December, however, he returned to his home country and signed for SD Huesca in the third level.

References

External links

1985 births
Living people
People from Cinco Villas, Aragon
Sportspeople from the Province of Zaragoza
Spanish footballers
Footballers from Aragon
Association football forwards
Segunda División players
Segunda División B players
Tercera División players
SD Ejea players
CD Universidad de Zaragoza players
CD La Muela players
SD Eibar footballers
SD Huesca footballers
Hércules CF players
CD Ebro players
Bolivian Primera División players
C.D. Jorge Wilstermann players
Athlitiki Enosi Larissa F.C. players
Spanish expatriate footballers
Expatriate footballers in Bolivia
Expatriate footballers in Greece
Spanish expatriate sportspeople in Bolivia